The Pileolariaceae are a family of rust fungi in the order Pucciniales. A 2008 estimate places contains 4 genera and 34 species in the family.

References

External links

Pucciniales
Basidiomycota families